Gateshead Grammar School was a school in Gateshead, Tyne and Wear, England, that operated from 1883 to 1967.

History
The private school Gateshead High School For Boys opened in 1883 at the junction of Durham Road and Prince Consort Road. It was purchased by Gateshead School Board in 1894 and became a coeducational "Higher Grade School" called Gateshead Secondary School. Publicly owned Higher Grade Schools were a new breed of school, similar to the privately owned Grammar Schools but putting much more emphasis on science and art.

It was renamed Gateshead Grammar School after World War II, still coeducational, but it became boys only in 1956. The school was on the former A1.

Comprehensive
It was rebuilt on the same site in 1963, and in 1968 it became Saltwell Senior High School - a coeducational comprehensive school which lasted until the 1990s when it was closed and mostly demolished, and the youngsters were transferred to Kingsmeadow Community Comprehensive School at Dunston.

Headmasters
Past headmasters included Mr. John Bidgood, Mr. W. Walton, Mr. G.L.R. Brown and Dr. Caffrey.

Teachers
Former teachers include:
 Prof John Tuck, Professor of Education from 1974-76 at Newcastle University (taught English from 1936-8)

Traditions
Its motto "Toil No Soil" was unusually in English (not Latin, Greek or French) and was taken from a quote of the Greek Poet Hesiod in his poem Works and Days, Toil is no disgrace, it is idleness which is a disgrace. The motto is interpreted as Toil (is) No Soil (soil being a synonym of disgrace) Included in list of mottos

Notable alumni
 Prof H. T. Dickinson, Richard Lodge Professor of British History at the University of Edinburgh, and President from 2002-5 of the Historical Association 
 Muriel Forbes CBE, Chairman from 1960-1 of Middlesex County Council
 David Forrest CBE, Secretary from 1983-1992 of the Charity Commission for England and Wales
 Kathleen Gales, medical statistician
 Alex Glasgow, songwriter
 Alexander Harvey, Principal from 1946-68 of the University of Wales Institute of Science and Technology (part of Cardiff University since 1988)
 Arthur Holmes, geologist, forerunner in dating the Earth by radiometric dating and also proposed mantle convection as the driving mechanism for plate tectonics.
 Angus Monro, Chief Executive from 1996-2001 of Matalan and from 2002-6 of Poundstretcher 
 Joseph McNally, Chief Executive from 1984-2001 of Compaq Computer UK
 John Morton, Chief Executive from 2005-8 of the Engineering and Technology Board, and Professor of Engineering from 1986-93 at Virginia Polytechnic Institute and State University
 Ken Norton (cricketer)
 Prof Bruce Pattison, Professor of Education from 1948-76 at the Institute of Education
 Sir George Russell CBE, Chief Executive from 1982–92 of British Alcan, Chairman from 1988-92 of the Independent Broadcasting Authority and from 1991-96 of the Independent Television Commission, and now an ITV executive
 David Skinner, Chief Executive from 1992-6 of the Co-operative Wholesale Society 
 John Steel (drummer), with The Animals
 Dame Muriel Stewart, President from 1964-5 of the National Union of Teachers 
 Prof Alan Stuart, Professor of Geology from 1957-9 at the University of Exeter
 Donald Tyerman CBE, editor from 1956–65 of The Economist 
 Sylvia Waugh, writer of children's books
 Peter Wilsher, journalist for The Sunday Times
 E. H. Young, novelist

References

External links
 
 Former building at iSee Gateshead

Educational institutions established in 1883
1883 establishments in England
Defunct grammar schools in England
Defunct schools in Gateshead
1967 disestablishments in England
Educational institutions disestablished in 1967